The Museum of Tomorrow is a science museum in the city of Rio de Janeiro, Brazil. It was designed by Spanish neofuturistic architect Santiago Calatrava, and built next to the waterfront at Pier Maua. Its construction was supported by the Roberto Marinho Foundation and cost approximately 230 million reais. The building was opened on 17 December 2015, with President Dilma Rousseff in attendance.

Exhibitions
The main exhibition takes visitors through five main areas: Cosmos, Earth, Anthropocene, Tomorrow, and Us via a number of experiments and experiences. This intricate yet captivating museum mixes science with an innovative design to focus on sustainable cities and an ecological world.

The museum was part of the city's port area renewal for the 2016 Summer Olympics.

Gallery

See also 

AquaRio

References

External links 

 

Santiago Calatrava structures
National museums of Brazil
Museums established in 2015
Museums in Rio de Janeiro (city)